In the Indian Parliament, a Standing committee is a committee consisting of Members of Parliament or MPs
. It is a permanent and regular committee which is constituted from time to time according to the provisions of an Act of Parliament or Rules of Procedure and Conduct of Business. The work done by the Indian Parliament is not only voluminous but also of a complex 
nature, hence a great deal of its work is carried out in these Parliamentary committees.

Both Houses of Parliament, Rajya Sabha and Lok Sabha, have similar committee structures with a few exceptions. Their appointment, terms of office, functions and procedures of conducting business are broadly similar. These standing committees are elected or appointed every year, or periodically by the Chairman of the Rajya Sabha or the Speaker of the Lok Sabha, or as a result of consultation between them.

There are two types of Parliamentary committee, the Standing committee and the Ad hoc committee.
 The Standing committees are constituted every year or frequently and they work on continuous basis. 
 Ad hoc committees are temporary and created for specific task. Once that task is completed, the ad hoc committees cease to exist.

Classification 
Standing committees are broadly classified as follows:

 Standing committee of Rajya Sabha
 Standing committee of Lok Sabha
 Departmentally related Standing committee under Rajya Sabha
 Departmentally related Standing committee under Lok Sabha.

By functions 
Based on the functions, standing committees can be broadly classified in following categories:

 committees to Enquire
 committees to scrutinise and control
 committees relating to day-to-day business of the House
 House Keeping committees
 Passing a Bill

See also
List of Indian parliamentary committees
List of Indian commissions

References

Committees of the Parliament of India
Standing committees